The 1935 Rice Owls football team was an American football team that represented Rice University as a member of the Southwest Conference (SWC) during the 1935 college football season. In its second season under head coach Jimmy Kitts, the team compiled an 8–3 record (3–3 against SWC opponents) and outscored opponents by a total of 201 to 101.

Schedule

References

Rice
Rice Owls football seasons
Rice Owls football